The list of Estonian records might refer to:

List of Estonian records in athletics
List of Estonian records in Olympic weightlifting
List of Estonian records in speed skating
List of Estonian records in swimming
List of Estonian records in track cycling

See also
:Category:Albums by Estonian artists
Estonian Record Productions

Records